This is a list of cases reported in volume 163 of United States Reports, decided by the Supreme Court of the United States in 1896.

Justices of the Supreme Court at the time of volume 163 U.S. 

The Supreme Court is established by Article III, Section 1 of the Constitution of the United States, which says: "The judicial Power of the United States, shall be vested in one supreme Court . . .". The size of the Court is not specified; the Constitution leaves it to Congress to set the number of justices. Under the Judiciary Act of 1789 Congress originally fixed the number of justices at six (one chief justice and five associate justices). Since 1789 Congress has varied the size of the Court from six to seven, nine, ten, and back to nine justices (always including one chief justice).

When the cases in volume 163 were decided the Court comprised the following nine members:

Notable cases in 163 U.S.

Plessy v. Ferguson
Plessy v. Ferguson,    163 U.S. 537 (1896), is regarded as one of the worst decisions in U.S. Supreme Court history, solidifying the practice of "Jim Crow". It is a landmark decision in which the Court ruled that racial segregation laws did not violate the U.S. Constitution as long as the facilities for each race were equal in quality, a doctrine that came to be known as "separate but equal". The decision legitimized the many state laws re-establishing racial segregation that had been passed in the American South after the end of the Reconstruction Era (1865–1877). Despite its infamy, the decision itself has never been explicitly overruled. But a series of the Court's later decisions, beginning with the 1954 Brown v. Board of Educationwhich held that the "separate but equal" doctrine is unconstitutional in the context of public schools and educational facilitieshave severely weakened Plessy to the point that it is considered to have been de facto overruled.

Wong Wing v. United States
In Wong Wing v. United States,    163 U.S. 228 (1896), the Supreme Court found that the 5th and 6th Amendments to the U.S. Constitution forbid imprisonment without a jury trial for non-citizens convicted of illegal entry to, or presence in, the United States. This case established that non-citizens subject to criminal proceedings are entitled to the same constitutional protections available to citizens. The ruling was issued on the same day as the court upheld racial segregation laws in its infamous Plessy v. Ferguson decision.

Lucas v. United States
In Lucas v. United States,    163 U.S. 612 (1896), the Supreme Court held that whether a Negro freedman was a member of the Choctaw Nation was a question of fact for a jury, and his non-Indian status may not be presumed.

Ball v. United States
Ball v. United States,    163 U.S. 662 (1896), is one of the earliest Supreme Court cases interpreting the Double Jeopardy Clause. Departing from the English common law rule, and from early decisions of the state high courts of New York and Massachusetts, the Court held that—under the Double Jeopardy Clause—the insufficiency of an initial indictment did not result in a jeopardy bar of acquittal, as long as the first court had jurisdiction.

Citation style 

Under the Judiciary Act of 1789 the federal court structure at the time comprised District Courts, which had general trial jurisdiction; Circuit Courts, which had mixed trial and appellate (from the US District Courts) jurisdiction; and the United States Supreme Court, which had appellate jurisdiction over the federal District and Circuit courts—and for certain issues over state courts. The Supreme Court also had limited original jurisdiction (i.e., in which cases could be filed directly with the Supreme Court without first having been heard by a lower federal or state court). There were one or more federal District Courts and/or Circuit Courts in each state, territory, or other geographical region.

The Judiciary Act of 1891 created the United States Courts of Appeals and reassigned the jurisdiction of most routine appeals from the district and circuit courts to these appellate courts. The Act created nine new courts that were originally known as the "United States Circuit Courts of Appeals." The new courts had jurisdiction over most appeals of lower court decisions. The Supreme Court could review either legal issues that a court of appeals certified or decisions of court of appeals by writ of certiorari.

Bluebook citation style is used for case names, citations, and jurisdictions.  
 "# Cir." = United States Court of Appeals
 e.g., "3d Cir." = United States Court of Appeals for the Third Circuit
 e.g.,"C.C.D.N.J." = United States Circuit Court for the District of New Jersey
 e.g.,"D. Mass." = United States District Court for the District of Massachusetts 
 "E." = Eastern; "M." = Middle; "N." = Northern; "S." = Southern; "W." = Western
 e.g.,"C.C.S.D.N.Y." = United States Circuit Court for the Southern District of New York
 e.g.,"M.D. Ala." = United States District Court for the Middle District of Alabama
 "Ct. Cl." = United States Court of Claims
 The abbreviation of a state's name alone indicates the highest appellate court in that state's judiciary at the time. 
 e.g.,"Pa." = Supreme Court of Pennsylvania
 e.g.,"Me." = Supreme Judicial Court of Maine

List of cases in volume 163 U.S.

Notes and references

See also
Certificate of division

External links
  Case reports in volume 163 from Library of Congress
  Case reports in volume 163 from Court Listener
  Case reports in volume 163 from the Caselaw Access Project of Harvard Law School
  Case reports in volume 163 from Google Scholar
  Case reports in volume 163 from Justia
  Case reports in volume 163 from Open Jurist
 Website of the United States Supreme Court
 United States Courts website about the Supreme Court
 National Archives, Records of the Supreme Court of the United States
 American Bar Association, How Does the Supreme Court Work?
 The Supreme Court Historical Society